Cotugno is an Italian surname. Notable people with the surname include:

Domenico Cotugno, (1736 – 1822) Italian physician, active in Naples
Guillermo Cotugno, Uruguayan footballer
Lorenzo Cotugno, Italian policeman
Nicolás Cotugno, Uruguayan cleric
Raffaele Cotugno, Italian politician
Stefano Cotugno, Italian military officer

Italian-language surnames